Lossenham Friary was a Carmelite friary in Newenden in the Weald of Kent, England.

History
Sir Thomas Alcher or Aucher founded the third Carmelite friary in England northeast of Newenden village in around 1242. It burnt down in 1275 but was rebuilt. It was dissolved in 1538. The site became the property of the Culpeper family, the heirs of the Alchers. There are no visible remains but Hasted reports that foundations were uncovered south of Lossenham Manor House and a stone coffin was found in the late 18th century.

References

External links
 English Heritage Pastscape
 The Lossenham Project

Carmelite monasteries in England
Monasteries in Kent